Ipatasertib (RG7440) is an experimental cancer drug in development by Roche. It is a small molecule inhibitor of AKT, which is a key component of the PI3K/AKT pathway. It was discovered by Array Biopharma and is currently in phase II trials for treatment of breast cancer.

In vitro, ipatasertib showed activity against all three isoforms of Akt.

References 

Experimental cancer drugs
Drugs not assigned an ATC code
Protein kinase inhibitors
Chloroarenes
Piperazines
Isopropylamino compounds
Secondary alcohols